The International Burch University (acronym Burch or IBU) is a private university established in 2008 in Ilidža, Bosnia and Herzegovina.

Officially accredited and/or recognized by the Ministry of Education, Science and Youth of Sarajevo Canton, International BURCH University is a small coeducational higher education institution.

References

External links
 Službena stranica univerziteta 

Universities in Bosnia and Herzegovina
Culture in Sarajevo
Educational institutions established in 2008
2008 establishments in Bosnia and Herzegovina